Wólka Pełkińska  (Vil’ka Polkyns’ka) is a village in the administrative district of Gmina Jarosław, within Jarosław County, Subcarpathian Voivodeship, in southeastern Poland.

The village has a population of 1,500.

References

Villages in Jarosław County